Sohm is the surname of:

 Joseph Sohm, American history teacher and Producer-Author-Public Speaker
 Lisa Sohm (born 1955), American model
 Rudolph Sohm (1841–1917), German lawyer and Church historian
 Pascal Sohm (born 1991), German footballer
 Willi Sohm (1913–1974), Austrian cinematographer

See also
 Sohm Abyssal Plain, plain in the North Atlantic
 Sohm Glacier